The Intex Cloud FX is an affordable smartphone running on Firefox OS that was sold in India for  (initially ). It is also sold under the Cherry Mobile brand in the Philippines where it is known as the Ace. Sporting a price tag of only 999 PhP.
Intex said it had sold 15,000 devices within three days of the launch and plans to sell 500,000 devices until the end of the year.

Intex Cloud FX is the first Firefox OS-powered phone to be introduced in the Indian market. Its Philippine equivalent is also the first Firefox OS smartphone in the Philippines and in Southeast Asia.

Features
Display with 480x320 resolution (164 ppi)
Battery1250mAh, 1100mAh (Ace)
Storage256 MB (On-board), 46 MB (Available). 4 GB expandable, 16 GB expandable (Ace)
Camera2MP rear
SoCSpreadtrum SC6821
CPU1 GHz
RAM128MB
Operating systemFirefox OS
ConnectivityWi-Fi, Bluetooth
SIM cardsDual-SIM

See also
 Comparison of Firefox OS devices

References

Firefox OS
Firefox OS devices